Andrew Anthony Vanzie (born 26 November 1990) is a Jamaican international footballer who plays for Portmore United, as a midfielder.

Career
Vanzie has played club football for Portmore United.

He made his international debut for Jamaica in 2011.

Career statistics

References

1990 births
Living people
Jamaican footballers
Jamaica international footballers
Association football midfielders
Portmore United F.C. players
Copa América Centenario players
National Premier League players